Stay the Same may refer to:

Music

Albums
 "Stay the Same" (album), or the title song, an album by Joey McIntyre

Songs
 Stay the Same (Joey McIntyre song)
 Stay the Same (Gabrielle song), a song by Gabrielle
 "Stay the Same", a song by London-based electronic band autoKratz
 "Stay the Same", a song by Nottingham electronica band Bent, from The Everlasting Blink.
 "Stay the Same", a song by Idlewild from The Remote Part